Laurence Walsh (8 February 1902 – 12 January 1976) was an Australian cricketer. He played in two first-class matches for South Australia in 1930/31.

See also
 List of South Australian representative cricketers

References

External links
 

1902 births
1979 deaths
Australian cricketers
South Australia cricketers
Cricketers from Adelaide